The 2013–14 Murray State Racers men's basketball team represented Murray State University during the 2013–14 NCAA Division I men's basketball season. The Racers, led by third year head coach Steve Prohm, played their home games at the CFSB Center and were members of the West Division of the Ohio Valley Conference.

They finished the season 23–11, 13–3 In OVC play and were OVC West Division champions. They lost in semifinals of the OVC tournament to the eventual champion Eastern Kentucky Colonels.

The Racers were invited to the CollegeInsider.com Tournament where they defeated the Missouri State Bears on the road and the Nebraska–Omaha Mavericks, Towson Tigers,  Pacific Tigers, and Yale Bulldogs at home to be crowned the 2014 CIT champions.

Roster

Honors
Cameron Payne was named to the First Team All-OVC and OVC Freshman of the Year; Jarvis Williams was named to the Second Team All-OVC; both were named to the OVC All-Newcomer Team.

As the Racers won the CIT post-season tournament, Cameron Payne and Jarvis Williams were named to the all-tournament first team, and Payne was named tournament MVP.

Cameron Payne was named  to the CollegeInsider.com 2013–14 Kyle Macy Freshmen All-America team and a finalist for the Kyle Macy Award as Division I Freshman of the Year.

Schedule

|-
!colspan=9 style="background:#000033; color:#ECAC00;"| Exhibition

|-
!colspan=9 style="background:#000033; color:#ECAC00;"| Regular season

|-
!colspan=9 style="background:#000033; color:#ECAC00;"| Ohio Valley Conference tournament

|-
!colspan=9 style="background:#000033; color:#ECAC00;"| CIT

References

Murray State Racers men's basketball seasons
Murray State
Murray State
CollegeInsider.com Postseason Tournament championship seasons